Midgley is a hill-top village in Calderdale, West Yorkshire, England. Nearby villages are Mytholmroyd  to the west-south-west, and Hebden Bridge  to the west-north-west.

The village is part of the Luddendenfoot ward of the Metropolitan borough of Calderdale, part of the Metropolitan county of West Yorkshire.

Midgley has a social committee to arrange events such as open gardens, village fetes, parties, quiz nights and wine tasting. A previous Co-op store has been refurbished to become a shop and community room staffed by volunteers; it opened in February 2010.

Local primary education is provided by Midgley School.

See also
Listed buildings in Luddendenfoot

References

External links

"Midgley West Riding", A Vision of Britain Through Time. Retrieved 15 January 2015 
Midgley Village, West Yorkshire
Midgley School

Villages in West Yorkshire
Geography of Calderdale